Like Rats is a studio album by American singer-songwriter Mark Kozelek, released on February 19, 2013 on Caldo Verde Records. Self-produced by Kozelek, the album is a collection of acoustic cover songs.

The album was released on the same day as Kozelek's live album, Live at Phoenix Public House Melbourne (2013).

Critical reception

Like Rats received mostly positive reviews. At Metacritic, which assigns a normalized rating out of 100 to reviews from mainstream critics, the album has received an average score of 64, based on 6 reviews, indicating "generally favorable reviews". Pitchfork Media's Stephen Deusner gave the album a mostly positive review stating, "His previous covers albums have been fan favorites, presenting his melancholy takes on songs by AC/DC, John Denver, Low, and Stephen Sondheim, but this new collection may be his most varied and adventurous. The track list portrays a man with broad listening habits, who not only translates these songs into his own particular style but erases the distinctions between genres."

Track listing

Personnel

Musicians
Mark Kozelek – vocals, acoustic guitar

Recording personnel
Mark Kozelek – producer
Aaron Prellwitz – recording
Nathan Winter – recording
Joshua Stoddard – recording
Gabe Shepard – recording

Artwork
Mark Kozelek – photography
Et Cetera – sleeve design

References

2013 albums
Mark Kozelek albums
Indie folk albums by American artists
Albums produced by Mark Kozelek
Caldo Verde Records albums
Covers albums